Harrison Stream is a small stream flowing west between Trachyte Hill and Cinder Hill to the north end of Romanes Beach on Ross Island, Antarctica. It was mapped by the New Zealand Geological Survey Antarctic Expedition, 1958–59, and named by the New Zealand Antarctic Place-Names Committee for J. Harrison, mountaineer-assistant with the expedition.

References

Rivers of the Ross Dependency
Landforms of Ross Island